Sebastián Emilio Núñez Rojas (born 13 March 1982) is a Chilean football manager.

References

External links
 Sebastián Núñez at PlaymakerStats.com

1982 births
Living people
People from Concón
Chilean football managers
Bolivian Primera División managers
Club Always Ready managers
Nacional Potosí managers
Club Real Potosí managers
Chilean expatriate football managers
Chilean expatriate sportspeople in Guatemala
Expatriate football managers in Guatemala
Chilean expatriate sportspeople in Bolivia
Expatriate football managers in Bolivia
Chilean expatriate sportspeople in Colombia
Expatriate football managers in Colombia
Universitario de Sucre managers